Raffaele Buzzi  (born 17 July 1995) is an Italian Nordic combined skier who competes internationally.

He competed at the 2018 Winter Olympics.

References

1997 births
Living people
Italian male Nordic combined skiers
Olympic Nordic combined skiers of Italy
Nordic combined skiers at the 2018 Winter Olympics
Nordic combined skiers at the 2022 Winter Olympics
People from Tolmezzo
Nordic combined skiers at the 2012 Winter Youth Olympics
Sportspeople from Friuli-Venezia Giulia
21st-century Italian people